The 1974–75 NBA season was the Rockets' 8th season in the NBA and 4th season in the city of Houston as well as their final season at the Hofheinz Pavilion before moving to The Summit a season later.

In the playoffs, the Rockets defeated the New York Knicks in five games in the First Round, before losing to the Boston Celtics in five games in the Semifinals.

Offseason

Draft picks

Roster

Regular season

Season standings

z – clinched division title
y – clinched division title
x – clinched playoff spot

Record vs. opponents

Playoffs

|- align="center" bgcolor="#ccffcc"
| 1
| April 8
| New York
| W 99–84
| Calvin Murphy (22)
| Kevin Kunnert (14)
| Mike Newlin (5)
| Hofheinz Pavilion10,218
| 1–0
|- align="center" bgcolor="#ffcccc"
| 2
| April 10
| @ New York
| L 96–106
| Rudy Tomjanovich (22)
| Kevin Kunnert (9)
| Newlin, Ratleff (4)
| Madison Square Garden19,694
| 1–1
|- align="center" bgcolor="#ccffcc"
| 3
| April 12
| New York
| W 118–86
| Rudy Tomjanovich (25)
| Rudy Tomjanovich (10)
| Murphy, Newlin (9)
| Hofheinz Pavilion10,218
| 2–1
|-

|- align="center" bgcolor="#ffcccc"
| 1
| April 14
| @ Boston
| L 106–123
| Rudy Tomjanovich (30)
| Tomjanovich, Riley (9)
| Calvin Murphy (6)
| Boston Garden15,320
| 0–1
|- align="center" bgcolor="#ffcccc"
| 2
| April 16
| @ Boston
| L 100–112
| Calvin Murphy (30)
| Kevin Kunnert (10)
| Calvin Murphy (9)
| Boston Garden13,254
| 0–2
|- align="center" bgcolor="#ccffcc"
| 3
| April 19
| Boston
| W 117–102
| Rudy Tomjanovich (28)
| Rudy Tomjanovich (12)
| Murphy, Hawes (7)
| Hofheinz Pavilion10,218
| 1–2
|- align="center" bgcolor="#ffcccc"
| 4
| April 22
| Boston
| L 117–122
| Calvin Murphy (35)
| Tomjanovich, Ratleff (11)
| Mike Newlin (6)
| Hofheinz Pavilion10,218
| 1–3
|- align="center" bgcolor="#ffcccc"
| 5
| April 24
| @ Boston
| L 115–128
| Tomjanovich, Murphy (27)
| Ed Ratleff (6)
| Ed Ratleff (6)
| Boston Garden15,320
| 1–4
|-

References

Houston
Houston Rockets seasons